Stéfano Yuri Gonçalves Almeida (born 27 April 1994), known as Stéfano Yuri, is a Brazilian footballer who plays for Thai club Pattani as a striker.

Club career
Born in Vazante, Minas Gerais, Stéfano Yuri joined Santos FC's youth setup in 2012, after starting his youth career with Uberlândia EC in 2009, aged 15. He soon earned plaudits for his performances with the under-20s, being the club's top goalscorer in 2014 Copa São Paulo de Futebol Júnior with nine goals.

On 29 January 2014 Stéfano Yuri made his first-team debut, coming on as a second-half substitute for Gabriel in a 5–1 home routing over Corinthians for the Campeonato Paulista championship. On 6 February he scored his first professional goal, netting the winner in a 2–1 away success over Linense.

Stéfano Yuri also scored the winner in a 3–2 home win against Penapolense on 30 March 2014, granting his team's qualification to the finals of Paulistão. He made his Série A debut on 26 April, again replacing Gabriel in 0–0 draw at Coritiba.

On 20 January 2015 Stéfano Yuri was loaned to Série B's Náutico. He only appeared in four league matches during the campaign, after struggling with injuries.

On 22 January 2016, Stéfano Yuri joined Botafogo-SP, on loan until the end of the year's Paulistão. Upon returning, he was assigned to the B-team, and on 23 March of the following year, he joined Vila Nova also in a temporary deal.

On 23 February 2018, after spending a period training with the main squad, Stéfano Yuri was loaned to São Caetano for two months. His loan was later extended until 31 August, when his contract with Santos expired; subsequently, he signed for Azulão permanently.

Career statistics

Honours
Santos
Copa do Brasil Sub-20: 2013
Copa São Paulo de Futebol Júnior: 2013, 2014

References

External links
Santos FC profile 

1994 births
Living people
Sportspeople from Minas Gerais
Brazilian footballers
Association football forwards
Campeonato Brasileiro Série A players
Campeonato Brasileiro Série B players
Santos FC players
Clube Náutico Capibaribe players
Botafogo Futebol Clube (SP) players
Vila Nova Futebol Clube players
Associação Desportiva São Caetano players
Brazilian expatriate footballers
Brazilian expatriate sportspeople in Thailand
Expatriate footballers in Thailand